Thiago Gentil (born 8 April 1980) is a Brazilian footballer who plays as a forward.

Playing career

Aris

In his 16 matches of the season 2007/08 (its second half), generally playing as a substitute, he scored 2 goals- where the first one was notable as a last-minute diagonal shot and equalizer against AEK FC in Athens. His contract was up in summer 2009.

European and Asian Experiences
The first European experience was in the Spanish "La Liga". In the summer time of 2006 he signed a 3-year contract with Deportivo Alavés, of the annual wages at least 800.000 euros. He gave very good appearances in Spain, but the financial problems that faced, in that period, Alaves with their owner Dimitri Pitterman, forced him to come back to his homeland at the club of Figueirense. There scouted him the persons of Aris and then proposed him a solid contract that soon made him a resident of Thessaloniki.

Alaves and Aris may be the only European clubs in his career account so far, but Gentil also had experiences from other continents. He played in Saudi Arabia with Al-Ittihad (Jeddah), contracted for more than 1 million euros for each year of collaboration. Still, played for Daegu FC in South Korea. Did not adapt well there, so returned to his homeland again.

Thiago Gentil signed for Nacional in Portugal during the January transfer window in 2010 on a free transfer.

External links

goalday.gr, article about Gentil 
greeksoccer.com forums, topic about Gentil

1980 births
Brazilian footballers
Brazilian expatriate footballers
Association football forwards
Living people
Sociedade Esportiva Palmeiras players
Clube Náutico Capibaribe players
Santa Cruz Futebol Clube players
Daegu FC players
Deportivo Alavés players
Figueirense FC players
C.D. Nacional players
Ittihad FC players
Aris Thessaloniki F.C. players
Grêmio Barueri Futebol players
Guarani FC players
K League 1 players
Primeira Liga players
Super League Greece players
Expatriate footballers in Saudi Arabia
Expatriate footballers in South Korea
Expatriate footballers in Spain
Expatriate footballers in Portugal
Expatriate footballers in Greece
Brazilian expatriate sportspeople in South Korea
Brazilian expatriate sportspeople in Portugal
Saudi Professional League players
Footballers from São Paulo